Anolis fuscoauratus, commonly known as the slender anole, slender Amazon anole, or brown-eared anole, is a species of lizard in the family Dactyloidae. The species is native to northern South America and Panama.

It was described as a new species in 1837. In 2009 the geographic range of this widespread species was found to extend farther south to Rio de Janeiro State in Brazil.

Names
The specific name, fuscoauratus, is derived from the Latin roots fuscus (combining form, fusco-) meaning "dark" and auratus meaning "golden". The name describes the lizard's morphological characteristic of having a dark gold skin colour.

It is called tai tsjõ in the Kwaza language of Rondônia, Brazil.

Habitat

Behaviour
A. fuscoauratus is arboreal.

Diet
A. fuscoauratus preys upon spiders, insects, and insect larvae.

Reproduction
A. fuscoauratus is oviparous.

See also
List of Anolis lizards

References

Further reading
Boulenger GA (1885). Catalogue of the Lizards in the British Museum (Natural History). Second Edition. Volume II. Iguanidæ .... London: Trustees of the British Museum (Natural History). (Taylor and Francis, printers). xiii + 497 pp. + Plates I-XXIV. ("Anolis fusco-auratus", pp. 48-49).
d'Orbigny A (1837). In: Duméril AMC, Bibron G (1837). Erpétologie générale ou Histoire naturelle complète des Reptiles, Tome quatrième [Volume 4]. Paris: Roret. ii + 571 pp. + errata et emendenda. ("Anolis fusco-auratus. D'Orbigny.", new species, pp. 110–111). (in French).
Silva-Soares T, Scherrer PV, de Castro TM, Salles ROL (2018). "Filling gaps in the geographic distribution of Anolis fuscoauratus d'Orbigny, 1837 (Squamata, Dactyloidae) in the southeastern Brazilian Atlantic Forest". Check List 14 (1): 15–19.

F
Lizards of South America
Reptiles of Bolivia
Reptiles of Brazil
Reptiles of Colombia
Reptiles of Ecuador
Reptiles of French Guiana
Reptiles of Guyana
Reptiles of Panama
Reptiles of Suriname
Reptiles of Venezuela
Reptiles described in 1837
Taxa named by Alcide d'Orbigny